Sjors is a Dutch version of the given name George.  Persons bearing the name include

 Sjors van Driem (born George van Driem, 1957), Dutch linguist at Leiden University
 Sjors Scheres (born 1975), Dutch scientist
 Sjors Verdellen (born 1981), Dutch soccer player
Rapper Sjors (born 1992) Dutch rapper 

Sjors is also the title of a Dutch comic book.

See also

 Joris (another Dutch version of the name George)
George (disambiguation)